Léo Schnug (17 February 1878, Strasbourg - 15 December 1933, near Brumath) was an Alsatian painter and illustrator of German ancestry.

Biography
When he was still very young, his father, a court clerk, was hospitalized for a mental illness. To survive, his mother rented out rooms in their house to performers from the municipal theater  and the opera costumes they brought with them became a source of inspiration.

After a few years at the School of Decorative Arts in Strasbourg, Anton Seder, one of his teachers, obtained work for him providing illustrations to Gerlach & Schenk, a Viennese publishing company. He was only seventeen at the time. His studies continued at the Academy of Fine Arts, München, where he studied under Nikolaos Gyzis.

He later moved back to Strasbourg and became a member of the Cercle de Saint-Léonard, where he learned marquetry from Charles Spindler and worked with a coterie of Alsatian artists, including Léon Hornecker, Henri Loux, Alfred Marzolff, Joseph Sattler, Lothar von Seebach and Émile Schneider. He was heavily influenced by Art Nouveau and Medieval themes.

Alcoholism
At the outbreak of World War I, he enlisted as a sergeant in the German Army. His excessive drinking brought several reprimands. He was due for more severe punishment, but was saved by the  intervention of Wilhelm II, who had honored him with the Order of the Red Eagle for his work on the restoration of the Château du Haut-Kœnigsbourg. Eventually, he began paying his bills at the local taverns by drawing small sketches on the tables.

His health began to decline rapidly after the war. From 1918 to 1919, he voluntarily entered "Stephansfeld" (the psychiatric hospital where his father was) for rehabilitation. When his father died in 1919, his crisis worsened. Then, when his mother died in 1921, he spent a short time at the Hospices Civil de Strasbourg but suffered a complete breakdown in 1924 and was involuntarily committed to Stephansfeld. He remained there until his death in 1933.

In addition to his regular art work, he also designed costumes, sets and various appurtenances for several public events. A street in Lampertheim (where he grew up) was named in his honor and a portrait of him is in the staircase of the Town Hall.

References

Further reading
John Howe, At destinys crossroads the art of Leo Schnug, 2017.
Marie-Christine Breitenbach-Wohlfahrt, Léo Schnug ou l’image retrouvée, Association "Mitteleuropa", Schiltigheim, 1997. 
 Patrick et Bénédicte Hamm, Léo Schnug, 1878-1933 : ses cartes postales, ex-libris et affiches, Jérôme Do Bentzinger, Colmar, 1993.
 Nicolas Mengus, Léo Schnug, in the Nouveau dictionnaire de biographie alsacienne, vol. 34, Fédération des sociétés d’histoire et d’archéologie d’Alsace, Strasbourg, 1999, p. 3515-3516
Gilles Pudlowski, Léo Schnug, in Dictionnaire amoureux de l'Alsace, Plon, Paris, 2010, p. 625-627

External links 

 Karger (European Neurology): Léo Schnug: Alcoholic Dementia as an Unexpected Source of Inspiration for an Artist by François Sellal
 Alsatica: Search results for Léo Schnug (texts and images)
 ArtNet: Six paintings by Schnug

1878 births
1933 deaths
Art Nouveau painters
20th-century German painters
20th-century German male artists
German male painters
Art Nouveau illustrators
Painters from Alsace
Artists from Strasbourg